Keep an Eye on Amelia (French: Occupe-toi d'Amélie) is a 1949 French-Italian comedy film directed by Claude Autant-Lara and starring Danielle Darrieux and Jean Desailly and Grégoire Aslan. It is based on the 1908 play of the same name by Georges Feydeau, set in Belle Époque Paris. It is one of several of film adaptations to be made of the story.

Background
One reviewer described it as a "lively adaptation of the popular Feydeau farce", "played with verve and charm by Danielle Darrieux", whose character is "an extremely personable young lady of not too difficult virtue". 
Another critic rated it highly; with a screenplay by Autant-Lara's regular collaborators, Jean Aurenche and Pierre Bost, he saw it as "a tour de force of virtuosity: the old play - about a rising cocotte in the Paris of 1900, who deceives her rich admirer, agrees to a mock marriage ceremony with an engaging rake to help him secure an inheritance, is herself deceived by a genuine ceremony, has the last laugh by signing the register under a false name and goes off to Venice with the young man on a lovers' trip - has been turned practically inside out. It becomes a film within a play, the action starting in a Paris street, moving on to a stage, then to a series of stylised film sets, returning at intervals to the theatre and glimpsing the footlights; and it moves, with unfaltering invention and control, at breakneck speed."

It was entered into the 1949 Cannes Film Festival. It was shot at the Billancourt Studios in Paris. The film's sets were designed by the art director Max Douy who won the decors award at Cannes.

The British Board of Film Censors at first denied a certificate for the UK screening of the film, but with the introduction of a new category 'X' it could then be shown uncut.

Cast
 Danielle Darrieux as Amélie
 Jean Desailly as Marcel
 Louise Conte as Irène
 Julien Carette as Pochet
 André Bervil as Étienne
 Grégoire Aslan as Le prince (as Aslan)
 Roland Armontel as Le général Koschnadieff (as Armontel)
 Victor Guyau as Van Putzeboom
 Charles Dechamps as Le maire
 Marcelle Arnold as La dame en mauve
 Lucienne Granier as Palmyre
 Colette Ripert as Charlotte
 Paul Demange as Moilletu
 Albert Michel as Un spectateur (as Albert-Michel)

References

Bibliography
 Goble, Alan. The Complete Index to Literary Sources in Film. Walter de Gruyter, 1999.

External links

1949 films
1940s historical comedy films
1940s French-language films
French black-and-white films
Films based on works by Georges Feydeau
Films directed by Claude Autant-Lara
Films with screenplays by Jean Aurenche
Films with screenplays by Pierre Bost
French films based on plays
Films shot at Billancourt Studios
French historical comedy films
Italian historical comedy films
Films set in Paris
Lux Film films
Belle Époque
1940s French films
1940s Italian films